The Ciucaș Mountains is a mountain range in Romania. It is located in the northern part of Prahova County and straddles the border with Brașov County.

The range consists of two ridges — the Ciucaș–Bratocea ridge in the southwest-northeast direction and the Gropșoarele–Zăganu ridge in the northwest-southeast direction — joined by the saddle formed  by the Chirușca peak.

The headwaters of the Buzău River, the Teleajen River, the Tărlung River, and many others are located in these mountains.

In Romania, the Ciucaș Mountains are considered part of the Curvature Carpathians. Geologically, according to the divisions of the Carpathians, the range is part of the Moldavian-Muntenian Carpathians, of the larger group of the Outer Eastern Carpathians.

The Cheia village is close to the mountain.

References

Mountain ranges of Romania
Mountain ranges of the Eastern Carpathians
Săcele